Robin Wood is a German environmental advocacy group. The group was founded in 1982 by former members of Greenpeace who desired a decentralized grassroots organization with greater autonomy to address specific local German issues.  Robin Wood is based in Bremen and, in 2008, was composed of fifteen mostly autonomous regional groups within Germany.

Initially concerned with the conservation of German forests, particularly the Black Forest,  the group's activism efforts later expanded to include rainforest conservation, paper recycling, reduction of acid rain and other related areas. Robin Wood stages "attention-grabbing" demonstrations and confrontational public protests to raise awareness. Although peaceful, the demonstrations are described as "often illegal." The group publishes the quarterly Robin Wood Magazin.

References

External links
official website

Environmental organisations based in Germany
Anti-nuclear organizations
Organisations based in Bremen (city)
Non-profit organisations based in Bremen (state)
Deutscher Naturschutzring
Organizations established in 1982
1982 establishments in Germany